Adnan Ugur (born 28 June 2001) is a Belgian footballer who plays as a midfielder for Turkish club Fatih Karagümrük.

Club career
Ugur signed a contract with Fortuna Sittard on 21 June 2019. Ugur made his professional debut with Fortuna Sittard in a 4–0 Eredivisie loss to AZ Alkmaar on 3 August 2019.

On 6 September 2021, he was loaned to Fatih Karagümrük in Turkey. At the end of the loan, Fatih Karagümrük exercised their option to buy, making the transfer permanent.

International career
Born in Belgium, Ugur is of Turkish descent. He is a former youth international for Belgium.

References

External links
 
 
 
 

2001 births
Belgian people of Turkish descent
People from Diest
Living people
Belgian footballers
Belgium youth international footballers
Association football midfielders
Fortuna Sittard players
FC Dordrecht players
Fatih Karagümrük S.K. footballers
Eredivisie players
Eerste Divisie players
Süper Lig players
Belgian expatriate footballers
Expatriate footballers in the Netherlands
Belgian expatriate sportspeople in the Netherlands
Expatriate footballers in Turkey
Belgian expatriate sportspeople in Turkey
Footballers from Flemish Brabant